Fadi Mohammed Ghosson (born 15 May 1979) is a Lebanese former professional footballer who played as a striker.

Club career 
Ghosson joined Ansar on 7 April 1999, coming from Olympic Dmit. After having moved to Australia in 2004, he returned to Ansar in 2005. He remained until 2009, scoring a total of 58 league goals.

Ghosson moved back to Australia, playing for Bankstown City Lions in 2009, and West Sydney Berries in 2010.

International career 
Ghosson played for the Lebanon national team between 1999 and 2006, being capped 10 times. In 2002, he played for the Olympic team at the 2002 Asian Games, scoring a hat-trick in an 11–0 win against Afghanistan.

Personal life 
After Ghosson and his fiancee got married in 2004, the two moved to Australia.

References 

1979 births
Living people
People from Baalbek District
Lebanese footballers
Association football forwards
Lebanese Premier League players
Al Ansar FC players
Bankstown Berries FC players
Canterbury Bankstown FC players
Lebanon youth international footballers
Lebanon international footballers
Asian Games competitors for Lebanon
Footballers at the 2002 Asian Games
Lebanese expatriate footballers
Lebanese expatriate sportspeople in Australia
Expatriate soccer players in Australia